The Zinho River is a river in Amazonas state, Brazil.

References

Rivers of Amazonas (Brazilian state)
Tributaries of the Amazon River